The Xinghai Conservatory of Music, also known as the Xinghai Conservatory, is a music conservatory in Guangzhou City, Guangdong Province, China. It has two campuses: one in the Guangzhou Higher Education Mega Center in Panyu District, another at No. 48, Xianlie Donglu (Xianlie Rd. E. ), Tianhe District. The conservatory was established in 1932 by the composer Ma Sicong as the Guangzhou Conservatory of Music.

Both the Xinghai Conservatory of Music and the Xinghai Concert Hall are named after the noted composer Xian Xinghai, who died on October 30, 1945, at the age of 40.

See also 
Beijing Midi School of Music
Central Conservatory of Music

External links 
Xinghai Conservatory of Music official site

 
Universities and colleges in Guangzhou
Guangzhou Higher Education Mega Center
Music schools in China
Educational institutions established in 1932
Arts organizations established in 1932
1932 establishments in China